Camp Cope are an Australian alternative rock trio formed in 2015 in Melbourne, Victoria. The group consists of lead singer, songwriter and guitarist Georgia "Georgia Maq" McDonald, bassist Kelly-Dawn Hellmrich, and drummer Sarah "Thomo" Thompson. Camp Cope are signed with independent Melbourne label Poison City Records - where Thompson also works, and independent Boston label Run for Cover Records distributed their releases in North America and Europe. In February 2023, Camp Cope announced that they would play a final show at Brunswick Music Fest on 11 March 2023 before disbanding.

Their eponymous debut album, released in April 2016, reached the top 40 in the ARIA Albums Chart, and was nominated for a J Award for Australian Album of the Year. They were also nominated in six categories at the inaugural National Live Music Awards and won the 'Heatseeker Award'. Website Faster Louder choose Camp Cope's self-titled debut album as their Album of the Year for 2016. The group also won Best Emerging Act at the 2016 The Age Music Victoria Awards. In 2019, Happy Mag listed them at no.3 on their list of "the 15 Australian female artists changing the game right now".

Camp Cope has been described as "part Courtney Barnett, part Juliana Hatfield", and "melodic, uplifting and aching". The band describes themselves as "power emo".

Career

2015–2020: Camp Cope and How to Socialise & Make Friends

As a regular of the Australian singer/songwriter circuit and with a handful of solo releases under her belt, McDonald decided to bring together Kelly-Dawn Hellmrich on bass and Sarah Thompson on drums to flesh out her solo project. Hellmrich had previously played in Sydney band Palmar Grasp, while Thompson had previously played in Brisbane band Razel. The band was named Camp Cope as a reference to Sydney beach Camp Cove, as Sydney native Hellmrich was feeling homesick. The band played support slots with the likes of The Hotelier, Andrew Jackson Jihad, and Waxahatchee, as well as playing their own headline shows.

The trio entered the studio, and by the end of the year had recorded their debut album with producer Sam Johnson. Released on Poison City in April 2016, their eight-track self-titled debut earned them critical acclaim and entered the ARIA albums chart at number 36. "Lost: Season One", a single from the album referencing the television show Lost, was performed by Camp Cope for Like a Version in September 2016, along with a cover of "Maps" by the Yeah Yeah Yeahs.

After a joint tour of Australia at the end of 2016 with Philadelphia's Cayetana, Poison City issued a limited split single that featured new material by both bands.

In 2017 Camp Cope supported Against Me! and Modern Baseball on their Australian tours, toured the United States with Worriers, performed at the St Jerome's Laneway Festival and sold out two shows in the Drama Theatre at the Sydney Opera House. At the end of the year, they returned to the studio to record their second album.

The band's second studio album, How to Socialise & Make Friends, was released on 2 March 2018 by Poison City Records and Run for Cover Records. In June and July 2018, they took part in their second United States tour, co-headlining with Run For Cover label-mates Petal. In late August and early September 2018 they undertook a partial UK and European tour with English band Caves.

In early February 2019, Camp Cope announced their first North American headlining tour starting in April, supported by Thin Lips, Oceanator and An Horse. On this tour, Maq started playing a new unreleased song. In September 2019, they embarked on a UK tour with post-punk band Witching Waves.

2021–2023: Running with the Hurricane and disbandment
In November 2021, Camp Cope released the single "Blue", which Rolling Stone highlighted as a "Song You Need to Know". On 19 January 2022, the band announced their third album, Running With the Hurricane, would be released on 25 March 2022. The title single "Running with the Hurricane" was released on 20 January 2022 via Poison City Records. Both the album and title track are named after the song ‘Running With The Hurricane’ by the Australian folk group Redgum, whose member Hugh McDonald is the late father of vocalist Georgia McDonald. On Instagram, McDonald stated "My dad had a song of the same name, I didn’t like the song to be honest, but the title buried its way into my soul and it felt like my life had been boiled down and summarised by those four words".

In February 2023, the band announced a Melbourne show as part of Brunswick Music Festival – while also announcing that it would be their last hometown show, and that the band would be dissolving.

Other ventures

Side projects 
All members of Camp Cope have been involved in other bands.

Hellmrich performs solo under the moniker of Kelso. Previous collaborators on the project have included Gab Strum of Japanese Wallpaper and Xavier Rubetzki Noonan of Self Talk. Self-described as 'cute weird songs for cute weird people', Kelso has released several singles as well as an EP, Always a Godmother, Never a God.

McDonald, under the moniker of Georgia Maq, released two solo acoustic EPs: Friends and Bowlers Run in 2013, and With a Q in 2014. A song from With a Q, "Footscray Station," was recorded by Camp Cope as the B-side to the single "Keep Growing". McDonald also released a split seven-inch with Spencer Scott in 2015. On 5 December 2019, McDonald released her debut solo album Pleaser, a pop record which she described as "Paul Westerberg meets Robyn". In 2021, McDonald said on the Creative Detour podcast that she is working on new solo material with no release date set. "I feel good about what I’m producing," she said. "I feel like I can produce things myself. In a really fun and cool way. Now I can kind of tell the difference a bit more between like Camp Cope songs and Georgia Maq songs."

Away from her solo career, McDonald was the vocalist for punk band Würst Nürse, and appeared on their debut EP Hot Hot Hot. She left the band in November 2018 after several vocal surgeries. McDonald was also briefly a member of Melbourne indie rock band Employment.

Thompson plays drums in Melbourne indie rock band TV Haze, which has released three albums since 2016.

Activism 
In 2016, Camp Cope led a campaign dedicated to preventing and reporting incidents at concerts and festivals called It Takes One. Through this, they put out t-shirts saying 'The Person Wearing This T-shirt Stands Against Sexual Assault And Demands A Change.' Many other artists such as Courtney Barnett, Chris Farren, DZ Deathrays, Ecca Vandal, Dune Rats and Alex Lahey have worn the shirt in support.

While playing the Falls Festival in 2017, Camp Cope changed the lyrics of their song "The Opener" to reflect the lack of female artists playing the festival.

In October 2017, the band performed to help raise funds for Girls Rock! Australia, and organisation which aims to close the gap between male and female musicians in the Australian music scene, by helping improve the skills and training of female and non-male identifying teenage musical artists.

Musical style 
Camp Cope is known for McDonald's powerful voice, Hellmrich's distinctive basslines, and Thompson's 'steady, stoic drumming'. They have been described as 'rough, minimal rock [with] a punk edge', and the lyrics 'articulate human entanglements with a lack of sentimentality that belies how much [McDonald] cares'. Songs are initially written by McDonald, who then sends a 'crappy phone recording' to Hellmrich and Thompson, before they all come together and create the finished song.

Influences 
Camp Cope has been influenced by many bands, such as Philadelphia indie rock bands Hop Along, and Cayetana, whose records they gave their engineer before recording How to Socialise & Make Friends. Bassist Hellmrich is also influenced by Joy Division bassist Peter Hook and blink-182 bassist Mark Hoppus.

Themes

In 2016, Hellrich described lead singer and songwriter Georgia McDonald as a "huge conspiracy theorist". McDonald said the song "Jet Fuel Can't Melt Steel Beams" was "a 'fuck you' to people [who] believe that 9/11 wasn't an inside job. [...] Believing that is like believing that men who rape women aren't responsible for their actions." McDonald said "JFCMSB isn’t named after a meme, it’s just the truth. The song is about the Orwellian way that the media and society try to convince you that lies are the truth. Like victim blaming. And 9/11."

Members
 Georgia Macdonald – lead vocals, guitar, piano 
 Kelly-Dawn Hellmrich – bass guitar 
 Sarah Thompson – drums

Touring musicians
 Jennifer Aslett – guitar, keyboards, piano, backing vocals (2022–2023)
 Lou Hanman – bass (2019, 2022; substitute for Kelly-Dawn Hellmrich)

Discography

Studio albums

Live albums

EPs

Singles

Music videos

Awards and nominations

AIR Awards
The Australian Independent Record Awards (commonly known informally as AIR Awards) is an annual awards night to recognise, promote and celebrate the success of Australia's Independent Music sector.

|-
| AIR Awards of 2017
| themselves
| Breakthrough Independent Artist
| 
|-
| AIR Awards of 2019
| How to Socialise & Make Friends
| Best Independent Hard Rock, Heavey or Punk Album
| 
|-

ARIA Music Awards
The ARIA Music Awards are a set of annual ceremonies presented by Australian Recording Industry Association (ARIA), which recognise excellence, innovation, and achievement across all genres of the music of Australia. They commenced in 1987. 

! 
|-
| 2018 || How to Socialise & Make Friends || ARIA Award for Best Rock Album ||  || 
|}

Australian Music Prize
The Australian Music Prize (the AMP) is an annual award of $30,000 given to an Australian band or solo artist in recognition of the merit of an album released during the year of award. It commenced in 2005. It exists to discover, reward and promote new Australian music of excellence.

!  
|-
| 2016
| Camp Cope
| Australian Music Prize
| 
| 
|-
| 2022
| Running with the Hurricane
| Australian Music Prize
| 
| 
|-

Australian Women in Music Awards
The Australian Women in Music Awards is an annual event that celebrates outstanding women in the Australian Music Industry who have made significant and lasting contributions in their chosen field. They commenced in 2018.

|-
| rowspan="2" | 2018
| Camp Cope
| Breakthrough Artist Award
|

J Award
The J Awards are an annual series of Australian music awards that were established by the Australian Broadcasting Corporation's youth-focused radio station Triple J. They commenced in 2005.

|-
| J Awards of 2016
| Camp Cope
| Australian Album of the Year
| 
|-
| J Awards of 2018
| How to Socialise and Make Friends
| Australian Album of the Year
|

Music Victoria Awards
The Music Victoria Awards, are an annual awards night celebrating Victorian music. They commenced in 2005.

|-
| rowspan="4"| 2016
| Camp Cope
| Best Album
| 
|-
| "Jet Fuel Can't Melt Steel Beams"
| Best Song
| 
|-
| rowspan="2"| themselves
| Best Band
| 
|-
| Best Emerging Artist
| 
|-
| rowspan="4"| 2018
| rowspan="2"| How to Socialise & Make Friends
| Best Album
| 
|-
| Best Rock/Punk Album
| 
|-
| "The Opener"
| Best Song
| 
|-
| themselves
| Best Band
| 
|-
| 2022
| Camp Cope
| Best Group
| 
|-

National Live Music Awards
The National Live Music Awards (NLMAs) are a broad recognition of Australia's diverse live industry, celebrating the success of the Australian live scene. The awards commenced in 2016.

|-
| rowspan="3" | National Live Music Awards of 2016
| Georgia Maq (Camp Cope)
| Live Voice of the Year
| 
|-
| Kelly-Dawn Hellmrich (Camp Cope)
| Live Bassist of the Year
| 
|-
| themselves
| The Heatseeker Award (Best New Artist)
| 
|-
| rowspan="5" | National Live Music Awards of 2017
| Sarah Thompson (Camp Cope)
| Live Drummer of the Year
| 
|-
| Kelly-Dawn Hellmrich (Camp Cope)
| Live Bassist of the Year
| 
|-
| rowspan="3" | themselves
| International Live Achievement (Group)
| 
|-
| People's Choice - Live Act of the Year
| 
|-
| Victorian Live Act of the Year
| 
|-
| rowspan="6" | National Live Music Awards of 2018
| rowspan="3" | themselves
| Live Act of the Year
| 
|-
| International Live Achievement (Band)
| 
|-
| Industry Achievement
| 
|-
| Georgia Maq (Camp Cope)
| Live Voice of the Year
| 
|-
| Sarah Thompson (Camp Cope)
| Live Drummer of the Year
| 
|-
| Kelly-Dawn Hellmrich (Camp Cope)
| Live Bassist of the Year
| 
|-

References

Feminist musicians
Musical groups from Melbourne
Musical groups established in 2015
All-female bands
Year of birth missing (living people)
2015 establishments in Australia
2023 disestablishments in Australia
Musical groups disestablished in 2023